Emily Otis (1807–1836), familiarly known as "The Beautiful Emily Marshall" and "The Belle of Boston", was an American woman celebrated for her beauty, grace, dignity, and feminine charm.

Personal life 

married William Foster Otis in May, 1831, and died in 1826, leaving two daughters and an infant son.

Fame 

"Emily Marshall as completely filled the ideal of the lovely and feminine, as did Webster the ideal of the intellectual and the masculine," Josiah Quincy, a native of the same State, wrote of her, adding that though superlatives were intended only for the use of the very young, not even the cooling influences of half a century enabled him to avoid them in speaking of her.

Daniel Webster upon one occasion, during his residence in Boston, entered the old Federal Street Theatre, and was hailed with cheers. A few minutes later Emily Marshall appeared in her box, when the entire audience rose as one man and offered her the same homage it had bestowed upon Webster.

References

Sources 
 Brooks, Geraldine (1901). Dames and Daughters of the Young Republic. New York: Thomas Y. Crowell & Co. pp. 269–287. 
 Peacock, Virginia Tatnall (1901). Famous American Belles of the Nineteenth Century. Philadelphia & London: J. B. Lippincott Co. pp. 90–101. 

1807 births
1836 deaths